Mount Morris Junior/Senior High School is a public high school located in Mount Morris, Livingston County, New York, U.S.A., and is the only high school operated by the Mount Morris Central School District.

Footnotes

Schools in Livingston County, New York
Public high schools in New York (state)